Snake City (also known as Snakes in the City) is a wildlife documentary television series that stars snake-catchers Simon Keys and his partner, Siouxsie Gillett. The show takes place in Durban, South Africa and has become valued for the series' entertainment and educational perspective on catching and releasing life-threatening snakes such as cobras, pythons and black mambas. The series features music by the Stereo MCs.

Presenters
Gillett has a Herpetology degree and zoo background while Keys has worked with snakes all of his life. The first season of Snake City featured Simon Keys’ ex-wife, Nadine Keys.

In the past, Keys and Gillett also worked at a snake sanctuary in Dunstable, Bedfordshire. Gillett has an allergy to the venom of the Mozambique spitting cobra that can elevate the potency of a bite.

Record temperatures and storms in South Africa have brought about an abundance of snakes in urban areas. In Summer months, they receive close to one hundred calls a week.

Series overview

Episodes

Season 1 (2014)

Season 2 (2015)

Season 3 (2017)

Season 4 (2017)

Season 5 (2018)

Season 6 (2019)

Season 7 (2021)
Season 8 is coming soon!

Season 8

1 Snake On A Roof

2

3 Cobras to Crocs

4 Mamba Nightmare

References

External links
 Snake City on Nat Geo Wild
 

2014 American television series debuts
2010s American documentary television series
English-language television shows
Television series about snakes